is a railway station in the city of Shinjō, Yamagata, Japan, operated by East Japan Railway Company (JR East).

Lines
Uzen-Zennami Station is served by the Rikuu West Line, and is located 10.6 rail kilometers from the terminus of the line at Shinjō Station.

Station layout
Uzen-Zennami Station has a single side platform, serving one bi-directional track. The station is unattended, and the station structure consists only of a small shelter on the platform.

History
Uzen-Zennami Station opened on September 1, 1966. The station was absorbed into the JR East network upon the privatization of JNR on April 1, 1987.

Surrounding area
The station is surrounded by rice fields, with no stores or houses in the immediate vicinity.

See also
List of railway stations in Japan

References

External links

 JR East Station information 

Stations of East Japan Railway Company
Railway stations in Yamagata Prefecture
Rikuu West Line
Railway stations in Japan opened in 1966
Shinjō, Yamagata